Amy Lazaro-Javier (born Amy Carillo Lazaro; November 16, 1956) is an associate justice of the Supreme Court of the Philippines. She was appointed by President Rodrigo Duterte replacing Associate Justice Noel Tijam.

Education 

She graduated Magna Cum Laude from the Philippine Normal College in 1977 with the degree of Bachelor of Science in Education. She received her law degree from the University of Santo Tomas. She graduated valedictorian in 1982.

Career 

She joined the Office of the Solicitor General in 1983 as trial attorney, and later became Assistant Solicitor General in 1994.

She was appointed to the Court of Appeals of the Philippines on August 29, 2007.

Supreme Court appointment 

In June 2017, Lazaro-Javier was under consideration to replace Associate Justice Bienvenido Reyes. Again in June 2018, Lazaro-Javier was under consideration to replace Presbitero J. Velasco Jr. On December 7, 2018, her name was once again submitted for a vacancy left by the retirement of Noel Tijam, and was finally appointed. She took the oath of office on March 6, 2019. She is expected to serve until 2026.

References 

1956 births
Living people
Associate Justices of the Supreme Court of the Philippines
Filipino women judges
Filipino women lawyers
Justices of the Court of Appeals of the Philippines
People from Manila
University of Santo Tomas alumni
Philippine Normal University alumni
21st-century women judges